The 27th Division was a formation of the VIII Corps of the Ottoman Army based in Haifa. It had been intended that its manpower would be raised from locally recruited Syrians and Arabs.

The division was composed of the 27th Artillery Regiment, and two infantry regiments the 80th and 81st.

References

Infantry divisions of the Ottoman Empire
Military units and formations of the Ottoman Empire in World War I